Chris Murray (born December 26, 1984) is an American former professional ice hockey defenseman.

Playing career
In 2011, Murray signed for the Charlotte Checkers in the American Hockey League after two seasons within the New Jersey Devils minor league affiliate's. In the end of the 2011–12 season with the Checkers, Murray was injured and was forced to sit out the following season in recovery. On July 18, 2013, Murray marked his return by signing a one-year contract with English club, the Nottingham Panthers of the Elite Ice Hockey League. Midway through the season, Murray moved to the German second tier league with Bietigheim Steelers in the German DEL2.

Career statistics

Awards and honors

References

External links 

1984 births
Living people
Albany Devils players
Albany River Rats players
SC Bietigheim-Bissingen players
Charlotte Checkers (1993–2010) players
Charlotte Checkers (2010–) players
Florida Everblades players
Hartford Wolf Pack players
HC Milano players
Lake Erie Monsters players
Lowell Devils players
New Hampshire Wildcats men's ice hockey players
Nottingham Panthers players
Peoria Rivermen (AHL) players
Phoenix RoadRunners players
Springfield Falcons players
Trenton Devils players
People from Dover, Massachusetts
Ice hockey players from Massachusetts
American men's ice hockey defensemen